Mountainside may refer to:

the side of a mountain
Mountainside, New Jersey, a borough
Mountainside, a community in the city of Burlington, Ontario, Canada
Mountainside Hospital, Glen Ridge, New Jersey